Ostuni Cathedral is a Roman Catholic cathedral in Ostuni, province of Brindisi, region of Apulia, Italy. The dedication is to the Assumption of the Virgin Mary. Formerly the episcopal seat of the Diocese of Ostuni, it has been since 1986 a co-cathedral of the Archdiocese of Brindisi-Ostuni.

History
The cathedral was originally a church practising Orthodox rites prior to the year 1000. In 1228-1229, the present Romanesque church was erected by Frederick II of Swabia. The earthquake of 1456, strongly felt in Brindisi, damaged it. During 1469-1495 it was again rebuilt in a Gothic style.   

The façade acquired its elegant rose window in the 15th century. The church once had four such windows. One of the portals is dedicated to Saint Blaise (San Biagio), one of the patrons of the city, and has the saint carved on the portal. A restoration in the 1970s tried to remove stucco decorations that covered the original Romanesque and Gothic architecture.

The interior has a number of artworks that covered the ceiling and altars. The Chapel of the Sacred Heart, once of St Cajetan (Gaetano) had a canvas of the saint attributed to Domenico Antonio Vaccaro. The Cappellone dell'Immacolata was decorated in the 18th century. The sacristy has a large venerated icon depicting Saint Oronzo. One Chapel is dedicated to the patron saints of Ostuni: Saint Blaise, Saint Augustine, Saint Orontius, and Saint Irene. The church once had a canvas, now stolen, of Santa Lucia by Palma il Giovane. The apse has an altarpiece of the Assunta, and the chapel of Santa Maria della Sanità has a fresco depicting Saint Catherine of Alexandria. A niche of the counter-facade has a 15th-century statue of Christ.

The cathedral archives hold nearly 200 parchments dating to the 12th century.

In 1986 it became a co-cathedral of the Archdiocese of Brindisi-Ostuni, and in 2011 was granted the status of a minor basilica.

References

Roman Catholic cathedrals in Italy
15th-century Roman Catholic church buildings in Italy
Romanesque architecture in Apulia
Gothic architecture in Apulia
Roman Catholic churches completed in 1495
Cathedrals in Apulia